Q51 may refer to:
 Q51 (New York City bus)
 Adh-Dhariyat, a surah of the Quran
 , a training ship of the Argentine Navy
 
 Kili Airport, in the Marshall Islands